Rich Nathan (born December 1955) is an American pastor and author who has been the senior Pastor of Vineyard Columbus since 1987. In January 2021, Pastor Nathan handed the Senior Pastor role to Eric and Julia Pickerill. He is still on staff as Founding Pastor and in charge of the Pastors Residency Program.

Early life and education
Nathan came to believe in Jesus at the age of 18. Prior to pastoring, he was an assistant professor of business law at The Ohio State University for five years. He has bachelor's degrees in history and religious studies from Case Western Reserve University in Cleveland, Ohio graduating magna cum laude, and a J.D. with honors from Ohio State University's Moritz College of Law in Columbus, Ohio.

Career
Nathan has served on the National Board of Vineyard: A Community of Churches for more than 20 years and is  the Large Church Task Force Coordinator for the Vineyard.  He is a national and international conference speaker and author of three books. Nathan has been noted as one of the strongest voices in favor of bringing together various streams of the church including the evangelical stream, the social justice stream, the charismatic stream and the liturgical stream.

Nathan has been outspoken on the subject of faith and politics.  In an interview with the Columbus Dispatch, he was quoted as saying:

Nathan has also been a major force for immigration reform, highlighting the issue in both sermons and op-eds.  He advocates for a different plan than those traditionally offered for America's illegal immigrants, "a pathway to citizenship governed by a system of checks and balances."  He has led Vineyard Columbus to embrace racial and ethnic diversity.  Vineyard Columbus is one of America's most diverse churches, having attendees from over 125 nations.  Nathan has been a leader in the Vineyard movement in advocating for women's full participation in all aspects of church ministry including becoming senior pastors, church planters, missionaries and Vineyard Association overseers.  As Nathan put it in a message on egalitarianism:  "God's gifts and call are not gender-based."

Vineyard Columbus
Vineyard Columbus (formerly Vineyard Christian Fellowship of Columbus and Vineyard Church of Columbus) is a church in Westerville, Ohio.  It is part of the Association of Vineyard Churches with headquarters in Sugar Land, Texas.

Vineyard Columbus dates back as a church to the late-1970s.  Three different churches joined to form the first church.  The church remained independent of any larger group for a number of years.  After investigating a number of groups to join with, the leadership of the church decided on the Association of Vineyard Churches, led by John Wimber.  They became the Vineyard Christian Fellowship of Columbus in 1987. Vineyard Columbus has experienced significant growth over the years, drawing about 7,500 people from over 125 nations at its weekend worship services and becoming the largest church in the Vineyard movement today.  It is a church that is self described as an "empowered evangelical" church, according to the definition in Rich Nathan and Ken Wilson's book Empowered Evangelicals that was published in the mid-1990s.

The original church in Westerville has planted more than 30 churches since 1987, including over a dozen in the Columbus area - all included in the Vineyard Movement. Vineyard Columbus also supports many Christian missionaries throughout the world.

In January 2019, Rich announced he will be handing the senior pastor duties over to associate pastors Eric and Julia Pickerill, effective January 2021.  Eric and Julia planted the Vineyard of Amsterdam in 2008 before returning to Vineyard Columbus in 2015.  Rich Nathan will remain of the staff at Vineyard Columbus as pastor at-large.

Satellite Campuses 
In 2009, Vineyard Columbus opened its first satellite campus, Vineyard Columbus Sawmill Campus, in Dublin, OH. This campus grew rapidly and started holding 2 services (9am and 11am) as of September 2013. In 2011, VC opened its second campus, Lane Avenue Campus of Vineyard Columbus. In the fall of 2012, VC launched its third campus, East Campus, at Berwick Alternative Elementary School. In early 2015, East Campus joined forces with the Eastside Vineyard church plant in Pickerington and moved operations out there. Vineyard Columbus also has a Spanish language campus called La Vina that meets in the Chapel of the Cooper Road location on Sundays at 11:30am.

Books
 Who Is My Enemy 
 (Co-authored) Empowered Evangelicals with Ken Wilson 
 (Co-authored) Both-And: Living the Christ-Centered Life in an Either-Or World with Insoo Kim

Notes

References
 
 Michael Gerson, "A New Social Gospel," Newsweek, November 13, 2006

External links
Columbus Dispatch article of May 11, 2007 regarding Vineyard Church of Columbus
Columbus, Ohio Community Relations article
Christianity Today article interviewing Nathan
Vineyard Church of Columbus

Living people
1955 births
Converts to Christianity
Ohio State University faculty
American Christian clergy
American sermon writers
American Pentecostal pastors
Association of Vineyard Churches
American evangelicals
Ohio State University Moritz College of Law alumni